Stereonychus is a genus of beetles belonging to the family Curculionidae.

The species of this genus are found in Europe and Japan.

Species:
 Stereonychus alternoguttata Marcu, 1951 
 Stereonychus angulicollis Voss, 1953

References

Curculionidae
Curculionidae genera